Tehsil Birpani is a town and Union Council in Bagh District, Azad Kashmir, Pakistan. 

The peak of Ganga Choti is a nearby tourist spot.
Tehsil Birapani .

References

Populated places in Bagh District